Sergey Sergeyevich Chudinov (born June 8, 1983 in Chusovoy) is a Russian skeleton racer who has competed since 2003.

Chudinov's best result is a victory at Lake Placid during the 2010/11 season on 17 December 2010; he also has other 3 podium finishes.

His best finish at the FIBT World Championships was 12th in the men's event at Lake Placid, New York in 2009. He qualified for the 2010 Winter Olympics where he finished 12th.

On November 27, 2017, the International Olympic Committee banned Chudinov for life from the Olympics for doping violations during the 2014 Winter Olympics and annulled his Olympic results.

References

External links
 
 
 
 

1983 births
Living people
Russian male skeleton racers
Olympic skeleton racers of Russia
Skeleton racers at the 2010 Winter Olympics
Skeleton racers at the 2014 Winter Olympics
Russian sportspeople in doping cases
Doping cases in skeleton
People from Chusovoy
Sportspeople from Perm Krai
20th-century Russian people
21st-century Russian people